Santa Lucia is a 1956 West German musical comedy film directed by Werner Jacobs and starring Vico Torriani, Eva Kerbler and Peer Schmidt.

The film's sets were designed by the art director Hans Berthel. It was shot using Eastmancolor.

Cast
Vico Torriani as Mario Zorzoli
Eva Kerbler as Yvonne von Fouqué
Peer Schmidt as Aristide
Karin Dor as Manina
Alexander Golling as Bärtiger
Hubert von Meyerinck as Tutu
Heinz-Leo Fischer as Vittorio
Margarete Haagen as Clementine
Edith Schultze-Westrum as Tante Rosa
Shirley Brown as Gina
Peter Fischer as Peppino

References

External links

1956 musical comedy films
German musical comedy films
West German films
Films directed by Werner Jacobs
Films about singers
Films set in Italy
Films set in France
Gloria Film films
1950s German films